Elmsäter is a Swedish surname. Notable people with the surname include:

Catharina Elmsäter-Svärd (born 1965), Swedish politician
Erik Elmsäter (1919–2006), the first Swedish athlete to compete in Summer and Winter Olympics

Swedish-language surnames